The fifth season of Ikki Tousen, titled Shin Ikki Tousen, is an anime television series based on the manga by Yuji Shiozaki, published by Wani Books and serialized in the seinen manga magazine Comic GUM. It is produced by Arms and directed by Rion Kujo, with scripts written by Masaya Honda, character designs handled by Rin-Sin and Tsutomu Miyazawa, and music composed by Yasuharu Takanashi. The series premiered on AT-X from May 17, to May 31 2022, and has three episodes. The theme song is "Proud Stars" by Konomi Suzuki.


Episode list

References

2022 Japanese television seasons
Ikki Tousen